Karel Stromšík (born 12 April 1958) is a former football goalkeeper from Czechoslovakia. He was a member of the national team that competed at the 1982 FIFA World Cup, playing 2 group games after replacing the injured Stanislav Seman in the second group match against England. Stromšík obtained a total number of four caps for his native country, between 24 September 1980 and 24 June 1982.

Playing career
Stromšík played in his country for several clubs, gaining the biggest success at Dukla Prague. He won the Czechoslovak First League with Dukla in 1979 and 1982.

Managerial career
After finishing his active career, he began with football coaching. He coached in the Czech Republic, Slovakia, Malaysia, Kuwait, India and other countries.

In Malaysia, Stromsik played for Selangor FA in the highest league of the country. He was regarded as the best goalkeeper the team ever had, after the late R Arumugam (Malaysian). Stromsik was often poached by other teams during his stint in Malaysia, but he remained a Red Giant throughout his Malaysian tour.

Stromšík moved to India and became manager of FC Kochin in 2001. From 2002 to 2003, he managed another Indian side Mahindra United FC in the National Football League.

Footnotes

References
 Profile

1958 births
Living people
Association football goalkeepers
Czech footballers
Czechoslovak footballers
Czechoslovakia international footballers
1982 FIFA World Cup players
Dukla Prague footballers
ŠK Slovan Bratislava players
SK Dynamo České Budějovice players
Czech football managers
Sportspeople from Nový Jičín
Expatriate football managers in Slovakia
Selangor FA players
Czech expatriate sportspeople in Slovakia
Czechoslovak expatriate footballers
Czechoslovak expatriate sportspeople in Malaysia
Czech expatriate sportspeople in Malaysia
Expatriate footballers in Malaysia
ŠKF iClinic Sereď managers
Slovak Super Liga managers